Trinity Chapel, also known as St. John's Church and Beth-El Temple Church of God in Christ, is a historic Episcopal church at 1874 Mott Avenue in Far Rockaway, Queens, New York.  It was built in 1858 to the design of architect Richard Upjohn (1802–1878).  It is a frame Gothic Revival style chapel on a brick foundation and three bays wide by five bays long.  It has a steeply pitched roof and sided in wood shingles.  Atop the roof is a wooden belfry with steeply pitched pyramidal roof.  It was founded as Trinity Chapel as a mission of Trinity Church in Hewlett, New York. Its name was changed to St. John's of Far Rockaway in 1881 when it became an independent parish. St. John's merged with Trinity Church in 1974 and the building was sold the following year to Beth-El Temple Church of God in Christ.

It was listed on the National Register of Historic Places in 2002.

References

Properties of religious function on the National Register of Historic Places in Queens, New York
Carpenter Gothic church buildings in New York (state)
Churches completed in 1858
19th-century Episcopal church buildings
Churches in Queens, New York
Rockaway, Queens
1858 establishments in New York (state)